clueQuest is an escape room for teams of 3 up to 5 players, based in London, United Kingdom. clueQuest is among the top activities to do in London, according to customer reviews.

The earliest escape the room game called ‘Origin’ dates back from 2006 and was created in Silicon Valley by a group of system programmers. In the same year, similar games became popular throughout China and then Japan. From 2007, the concept became a worldwide phenomenon, with over 360 companies running live escape games at the moment.

Origins

clueQuest opened in June 2013 and is the brainchild of four Hungarian brothers with a love for puzzles: Gabor, Peter, Gergely and Zoltan. The creators of clueQuest wanted to bring to the British live escape game market a concept similar to Parapark - an escape room highly regarded in the competitive market in Hungary.

Initially based in Tottenham Hale, then near Liverpool Street station, clueQuest now operates from a new location near King's Cross St. Pancras.

Format

The Game

clueQuest revolves around the spy-world of Mr Q, who is also the image of the brand. 
Participating teams have 60 minutes to escape the rooms using teamwork and common sense logic to gather clues and solve the puzzles. clueQuest is an accessible experience to both children and adults.

The Missions

Aspiring secret agents can pick from three available missions: PLAN52, Operation BlackSheep and Revenge of the Sheep.

PLAN52

PLAN52 is a real life escape room and the first spy-themed mission created by clueQuest, London.

Origins

The room first opened on 6 June in Tottenham Hale. 
Additional PLAN52 units were added in December 2013 and November 2014 allowing larger groups to play the same experience, while racing each other to escape. 
PLAN52 is currently run from the clueQuest headquarters near King's Cross St. Pancras tube station. 
 
Description

Also known as the ‘Red Box’ room, PLAN52 is a classic escape room, often compared to the British game show, The Crystal Maze.

In the game, PLAN52 doubles up as a training facility for teams of aspiring recruits. The players are put through Mr Q's 60 Minute challenge before they can officially become secret agents.

Operation BlackSheep

Operation BlackSheep is the second real life escape room created by clueQuest, London, and it complements the storyline of PLAN52, their original mission.

Origins

Operation BlackSheep (OBS) opened to the public on the 1st of March 2014. The second unit was added in May 2014 and the mission is currently run from the clueQuest headquarters near King's Cross St Pancras. Fans of Douglas Adams' The Hitchhiker's Guide to the Galaxy will come across a few good references while playing the game as the book was one of the room's main inspirations.

Description

Also known as the ‘Satellite’ mission, Operation BlackSheep introduces Mr Q's arch-enemy, Professor BlackSheep, and his plans of world domination.

In the game, aspiring secret agents have 60 Minutes to stop the Professor from taking over mankind and to escape before his Command Center self-destructs.

Revenge of the Sheep 
Revenge of the Sheep is the third escape room created by clueQuest, London, and it complements the story-line of Operation BlackSheep.

Description

Professor BlackSheep is back again to destroy mankind as we know it by turning us all into sheep! And this time he is not alone - he's got an evil side-kick and together they have built a dangerous device: the SheepMutator.

Characters

Mr Q

Mr Q, ‘the yellow mouse’, is the fictional leader and main character the spy-themed real life escape game, clueQuest. He is easily recognized by his white lab coat and quizzing stare.

Origins

Created by Gergely Papp, graphic designer and co-founder of clueQuest, Mr Q was initially a university side project.

In June 2013, the yellow mouse became the ‘image’ of clueQuest, and the world's second super-spy mouse, after Danger Mouse.

Description

Mr Q is the mysterious leader of the undercover crime fighting secret agency, clueQuest. His goal is to save the Universe and to protect mankind from menacing villains such as Professor BlackSheep, his nemesis.

When he is not out on super secret missions, Mr Q is found in the company of Mrs Q, his wife. The couple are the main protagonists of an ongoing web-series of comic strips.

Professor BlackSheep

Professor BlackSheep is a fictional villain from the spy-themed real life escape game, clueQuest, and the antagonist of Mr Q.

Origins

Created by Gergely Papp, graphic designer and co-founder of clueQuest, Professor BlackSheep is based on the mad scientist stereotype often portrayed in movies and cartoons. He is an Emmett Brown of Back to the Future with a twist of evil.

Description

The Professor is a mastermind super-villain with a passion for space engineering and romance novels. He is Mr Q's nemesis which means that he is constantly plotting against him and trying to outsmart him.

Kevin 

Professor BlackSheep evil side-kick.

References

Escape rooms